Princess Caroline Elizabeth Ida Reuss of Greiz (13 July 1884 – 17 January 1905) was the first wife of Wilhelm Ernst, Grand Duke of Saxe-Weimar-Eisenach.

Biography

Early life
Caroline was a daughter of Heinrich XXII, the reigning Prince Reuss of Greiz by his wife Princess Ida, daughter of Adolf I, Prince of Schaumburg-Lippe and Princess Hermine of Waldeck and Pyrmont, aunt of Queen Emma of the Netherlands. Her mother died in 1891, and her father died in 1902. She had only one surviving brother, Prince Heinrich XXIV Reuss of Greiz, who was incapable of governing because of the physical and mental ailments that resulted from a childhood accident. Power passed to their cousin  Heinrich XIV, Prince Reuss Younger Line as a result once their father died. Her younger sister Princess Hermine Reuss of Greiz would later marry Emperor Wilhelm II as his second wife.

Marriage
The betrothal of Princess Caroline and Wilhelm Ernst, the reigning Grand Duke of Saxe-Weimar-Eisenach since 1901, was announced on 10 December 1902. At Buckeburg Castle (the home of her uncle), they married on 30 April 1903. Caroline was reportedly very against the match; at the last second of the wedding, she attempted to draw back, only to be persuaded most forcibly by Emperor Wilhelm II and Empress Augusta Viktoria to proceed with the marriage. Caroline wore a dress of white satin trimmed with lace; her cousins Prince George of Schaumburg-Lippe and Prince Heinrich XIV of Reuss zu Schleiz, as well as William Ernest's mother Dowager Hereditary Grand Duchess Pauline attended the wedding. His cousin Queen Wilhelmina and her consort Prince Hendrik also came to the wedding.

Life at the Weimar court

The marriage was unhappy, as Caroline found the rigid Weimar court etiquette intolerable. The court was generally considered to be one of the most stifling and etiquette-driven in Germany. One source recounted:"It envelops royalty there in a species of captivity, and while the grand duke lends thereto and is too conservative to admit of any change, it crushes with its trammels the more spirited members of the family".

Her husband was described as:
"One of the wealthiest sovereigns in Europe; stolid, well-behaved, imbued with great pride of race, and a strict sense of what is due to the anointed of the Lord. He is also one of the most severely respected and proper of German rulers...the Grand Duke is very dull, and his court and environment reflect his character in this respect to such a point that Weimar has become the dreariest capital in Europe".

Caroline caused a scandal by seeking refuge in Switzerland; her husband followed soon after, as it was made understood that she had not fled the marriage but instead had simply sought to be away from her entourage in Weimar. She was eventually induced to return, but soon lost health and lapsed into melancholia. She died eighteen months after their marriage, on 17 January 1905, under mysterious circumstances. The official cause of death was pneumonia following influenza; other sources however have suggested suicide. The couple had no children together. She was the last member of the House of Saxe-Weimar to be buried in the Weimarer Fürstengruft, the royal family's crypt. William Ernest later remarried to Princess Feodora of Saxe-Meiningen.

Honours
 : Dame Grand Cross of the White Falcon, in Diamonds
 : Dame of the Order of Louise, 1st Class

Ancestry

References

|-

1884 births
1905 deaths
House of Saxe-Weimar-Eisenach
Grand Duchesses of Saxe-Weimar-Eisenach
Princesses of Reuss
Daughters of monarchs